Fort Jackson may refer to several places or things:

 Fort Jackson (Alabama), also called Fort Toulouse, a War of 1812 fort
 Fort Jackson (Colorado), a frontier trading post located near present-day Ione, Colorado
 Fort Jackson, Louisiana, an American Civil War–era fort
 Fort Jackson (Pennsylvania), a frontier and Revolutionary War fort in western Pennsylvania
 Fort Jackson (South Carolina), a modern U.S. Army post
 Fort Jackson (Virginia), an American Civil War–era fort that defended Washington, D.C.
 Fort Jackson (Wisconsin), an American fort used during the Black Hawk War of 1832
 Fort James Jackson, a War of 1812 fort that defended Savannah, Georgia
 USS Fort Jackson (1862), an American Civil War–era ship
 Treaty of Fort Jackson, an 1814 treaty
 Battle of Forts Jackson and St. Philip, a battle in the American Civil War